John M. Traffley  (1862–1900) was an American professional baseball player who played for the 1889 Louisville Colonels. He appeared in one game for the Colonels, on June 15, 1889 as an outfielder. His brother, Bill Traffley, also played professional baseball. He got his chance to play for the Colonels because some of the regular ballplayers were on strike.

External links

Baseball players from Chicago
Louisville Colonels players
1862 births
1900 deaths
19th-century baseball players